See Austin A40 for other A40 models and Austin A40 Sports for the sports car version of the Devon.

The A40 Devon (and similar 2-door A40 Dorset) are automobiles that were marketed by Austin from 1947 to 1952 –  the first post-war saloons to be produced by Austin –  featuring a mix of old and new technologies.  They were previewed by the UK press at the Paris Motor Show on 22 October 1947, who expressed immediate disappointment at the car's conservative appearance. More than 450,000 were built before the model's replacement in 1952 by the Austin A40 Somerset.

Mechanicals and bodystyles
Both the Devon and Dorset were body-on-frame designs with modern bodies and a 1.2 L straight-4 OHV engine producing  at 4200 rpm.  They featured front coil sprung independent suspension but retained a rigid axle and semi-elliptic leaf springs at the rear. The Girling brakes with  drums were operated hydraulically at the front and mechanically at the rear. Later cars had column operated gear change and full hydraulic braking. A sliding sunroof and heater were extra cost options on the UK market.

The Devon was the 4-door version and was more successful than the 2-door Dorset, which was dropped in 1949 after only 15,939 were made.

The "Countryman" estate was produced up until 1956. A van and pickup truck were also produced.

The Devon was the first post-war-designed Austin to be assembled in New Zealand. It was produced from CKD kits at the Austin Distributors Federation assembly plant in Petone. Some examples are still on the road. (there is an A40 Devon operating and registered in Hamilton as of 2019).

A prototype A40 Dorset Tourer was built at Longbridge in 1948. Although it was never put into production in England, various versions of the A40 Tourer were made in Australia beginning in September 1948.

Performance and driving impressions
The test car, which had the optional sliding roof, cost £505 including taxes. Commentators also commended the "excellent (floor lever controlled four speed) gear change" (on the early models) with smooth clutch action. The brakes, however, needed "fairly firm pedal pressure ... for maximum results".

Commercial
The car sold well, boosting Austin's standing in the sales charts in the process. Its success was attributed to the fact that it offered a lot of car for the money.

Austin A40 Sports

As one in a series of collaborations between Austin and Jensen Motors of West Bromwich, the A40 Sports originated when Austin's chairman Leonard Lord, upon seeing the Jensen Interceptor, requested that Jensen develop a body that could use the Austin A40 Devon mechanicals. During production, A40 Sports bodies were built by Jensen and transported to Austin's Longbridge plant for final assembly, with approximately 4,011 examples manufactured.

References

External links

 Austin Counties Car Club
 Austin Memories, History of Austin and Longbridge
  Video of 1948 Austin Devon Drag-car Testing
 Video of 1948 Austin Devon dragster 

A40 Devon
1950s cars
Cars introduced in 1947
Rear-wheel-drive vehicles
Sedans
Station wagons
Convertibles

sv:Austin A40